Edwin Noel Perrin (September 18, 1927 – November 21, 2004) was an American essayist and a professor at Dartmouth College, known for writing about rural life.

Early years
Perrin was born on September 18, 1927 in Manhattan and grew up in Pelham Manor, New York. His parents both worked as advertising copywriters at the J. Walter Thompson Agency. His mother Blanche was a career writer and the author of several novels, and she was his inspiration to become a writer.

Perrin was educated at the Woodberry Forest School in Orange, Virginia, and later at Williams College where he majored in English Literature and graduated in 1949. He received a master's degree from Duke University in 1950, then served in the Army. During the Korean War, he served as a forward observer in a field artillery unit and was awarded the Bronze Star.

Teaching and writing career
Perrin taught English literature at the Woman's College of the University of North Carolina from 1956 to 1959. He further studied at Cambridge University, where he received a Master's of Literature degree in 1958. He joined the Dartmouth faculty in 1959 as an instructor in English, reaching the rank of full professor by 1970. He specialized in teaching modern poetry, particularly that of Robert Frost. He was a Fulbright professor at Warsaw University in Poland in 1970, and was twice a Guggenheim Fellow. He joined Dartmouth's Environmental Studies Program in 1984 as an Adjunct Professor, teaching courses on a range of subjects.

Perrin wrote essays for many publications and was a regular contributor to the Washington Post for more than 20 years, covering a wide variety of subjects. His Washington Post essays later were published as A Reader's Delight (1988), one of his 12 books. His later Washington Post columns about forgotten works of children's literature were collected in A Child's Delight (1997). His second book was Dr. Bowdler's Legacy: A History of Expurgated Books in England and America (1969) and was nominated for the National Book Award. His sixth book was Giving up the Gun: Japan's Reversion to the Sword, 1543–1879.

In 1963, Perrin bought a farm in Thetford Center, Vermont which served him as home and grist for six books, including First Person Rural: Essays of a Sometime Farmer (1978). He often wrote essays about rural life in a fashion similar to the poems of Will Carleton. "He reveled in the rural life," said writer Reeve Lindbergh, whose sister was Anne Lindbergh, elder daughter of Charles Lindbergh and Perrin's third wife.

Perrin once wrote to a friend: "I currently spend half my time teaching at Dartmouth, half farming and half writing. That this adds up to three halves I am all too aware."

Personal life

Family
Perrin was married four times: to Nancy Hunnicut, from 1960 until their divorce in 1971; to Annemarie Price, from 1975 until their divorce in 1980; to Lindbergh, from 1988 until her death in 1993; and Sara Coburn, until his death. He had two daughters from his first marriage.

Environmentalism
Perrin's interest in environmental matters, including alternative energy sources, led him to purchase an electric car in 1990. He recounted his adventures driving his converted Ford Escort from Solar Electric Engineering in California to his Vermont home in Solo: Life with an Electric Car (1992). One advantage of the car proved to be a rare reserved parking spot on campus—with its own electrical outlet. Perrin later put a solar panel array on his barn roof.

Death
Perrin, who suffered from Shy–Drager syndrome, died at his farmhouse on November 21, 2004, aged 77.

His works
 A Passport Secretly Green (1961)
 Dr. Bowdler's Legacy: A History of Expurgated Books in England and America (1969)
 Vermont in All Weathers (1971)
 Amateur Sugar Maker (1972)
 First Person Rural: Essays of a Sometime Farmer (1978)
 Giving up the Gun: Japan's Reversion to the Sword, 1543–1879 (1979)
 Second Person Rural: More Essays of a Sometime Farmer (1980)
 Third Person Rural: Further Essays of a Sometime Farmer (1983)
 Forever Virgin: The American View of America (1986, in Antaeus)
 A Reader's Delight (1988)
 Last Person Rural (1991)
 Solo: Life with an Electric Car (1992)
 A Child's Delight (1997)
 Best Person Rural: Essays of a Sometime Farmer (2006), edited by Terry S. Osborne

References

External links 
 November 30, 2004 Remembering Noel Perrin: NPR overview about Noel Perrin, including excerpts from Noel Perrin's 1978 NPR Interview
 The Boston Globe Biography of Noel Perrin
 Perrin Book Reviews
 Further Book reviews

1927 births
2004 deaths
20th-century American male writers
20th-century American non-fiction writers
20th-century essayists
Alumni of the University of Cambridge
American essayists
Dartmouth College faculty
Deaths from multiple system atrophy
Duke University alumni
Neurological disease deaths in Vermont
People from Pelham Manor, New York
People from Thetford, Vermont
The Washington Post people
United States Army officers
United States Army personnel of the Korean War
Williams College alumni
Woodberry Forest School alumni
Writers from Manhattan